Bill Stewart (7 December 1942, in Liverpool, Lancashire, England – 29 August 2006 in London) was an English actor best known for his role as Denton Evening News reporter Sandy Longford in the British television programme A Touch of Frost. He also made appearances on Z-Cars and MacGyver and had roles in such films as 101 Dalmatians and Anna and the King.

He died on 29 August 2006 of motor neurone disease.

Filmography

External links

References 

English male television actors
English male film actors
Male actors from Liverpool
1942 births
2006 deaths